The Bandit Trail is a 1941 Western film.

Plot
A cowboy helps rob a bank to get revenge on an unscrupulous banker.

Cast
 Tim Holt as Steve Haggerty
 Ray Whitley as Smokey
 Janet Waldo	as Ellen Grant
 Lee 'Lasses' White as Whopper
 Morris Ankrum as Red Haggerty
 Roy Barcroft as Joel Nesbitt
 Glenn Strange as Gang member

References

External list
 
 
 
 

1941 films
1941 Western (genre) films
American Western (genre) films
RKO Pictures films
Films directed by Edward Killy
Films produced by Bert Gilroy
American black-and-white films
1940s American films
1940s English-language films